Adrian Năstase (born 22 June 1950) is a Romanian jurist, academic/professor, blogger, and former politician who served as the Prime Minister of Romania from December 2000 to December 2004.

He competed in the 2004 presidential election as the Social Democratic Party (PSD) candidate, but was defeated by the centre-right Justice and Truth Alliance (DA) candidate Traian Băsescu who pertained at that time to the Democratic Party (PD).

He was the President of the Chamber of Deputies from 21 December 2004 until 15 March 2006, when he resigned due to corruption charges. Sentenced to two years in prison in July 2012, he attempted suicide before beginning his term in the penitentiary. Released in March 2013, he was sentenced to four years in another case in January 2014, but released that August.

Biography

Family background

Năstase was born in Bucharest to a family that originated from Hanul de Pământ village, Tărtășești commune, Dâmbovița County. His father, Marian Năstase, was an officer of the Royal Romanian Army. His mother is named Elena and he has a sister, Dana Barb (née Năstase).

Youth period

Adrian Năstase finished high school at Nicolae Bălcescu High School (now Saint Sava National College) and then graduated from the University of Bucharest, receiving degrees from both the Department of Law and the Department of Sociology. He worked at various times as a professor, judge, and as president of several organizations involved with law and international relations.

They have two sons, Andrei (b. 12 February 1986) and Mihnea (b. 23 June 1993).

Post-1989 political career

Năstase was first elected to the Chamber of Deputies of Romania as member of the National Salvation Front party on 9 June 1990 and served as the Minister of Foreign Affairs in the governments of Petre Roman and Theodor Stolojan (28 June 1990 – 16 October 1992).

In 1992, he was re-elected to the Chamber of Deputies as a member of the Democratic National Salvation Front (FDSN) and served as the President of the Chamber of Deputies. Between 1993 and 1997, he was also the executive president of the Party of Social Democracy in Romania (PDSR, formerly the FDSN).

When the PDSR lost the 1996 elections, Năstase became leader of the opposition PDSR parliamentary group, vice-president of Chamber of Deputies, and member of Standing Bureau and Member of the Romanian delegation to the Parliamentary Assembly of the Council of Europe where he was the Recording Secretary of Council of Europe commission on judicial problems and human rights with reference to illegal activities by religious sects.

After the victory of the PDSR in the 2000 legislative elections and the re-election of Ion Iliescu as president of Romania, Năstase was elected president of the PDSR, which soon changed its name to the Social Democratic Party (PSD) after merging with another party. Năstase remained PSD president until April 2005 when he was replaced by former foreign minister Mircea Geoană at a party congress.  At the same congress, Năstase was elected to be PSD executive president, the second most senior position in the party.

Term as Prime Minister of Romania

Năstase was confirmed by the Parliament as Prime Minister on 28 December 2000, following his appointment to the position in days before by President Ion Iliescu. He held the position concurrently with his leadership of the PSD.  His four years as Prime Minister were characterized by unprecedented political stability in post-communist Romania, continuous economic growth, and a foreign policy strongly oriented toward the West, although during 2001, the press and some of the political opposition questioned this in light of his close association with former Securitate agent Ristea Priboi. Romania joined NATO, and committed Romanian troops in support of international efforts in the Balkans, Afghanistan, and Iraq.

His government completed accession negotiations with the European Union (EU) and aggressively passed legislation and implemented a number of reforms required for EU accession, which was subsequently completed with the 2007 enlargement of the European Union. His government successfully negotiated the lifting of visa restrictions on Romanians traveling to EU Schengen treaty countries.

Inflation decreased and the Romanian leu became stronger. However, critics pointed out that this was at least partially due to an influx of foreign currency into Romania from the estimated two million Romanians working abroad.  GDP also grew substantially during each year of his term, with a growth of 8.3% achieved in 2004, the highest in the region. Average wages similarly grew, although they did not match the pace of economic growth. For example, in 2004 wages grew by 10.4%, with a 9.2% inflation rate, thereby leading to a real wage growth of 1.2%, in a year when GDP grew by 7%.

The Năstase government did not make substantial inroads on a number of important issues in Romanian society, such as agricultural policy: about 42% of Romanians continued to work in agriculture (compared to 3% of French and 19% of Poles). Critics also pointed out that economic growth was not evenly distributed among the social classes, and the percentage of people living below the poverty level remained high, especially in the rural areas.

Although the government took initial steps toward meaningful judicial reform, the government was repeatedly criticized, including by the EU, for failing to combat substantially widespread corruption, including at the highest levels.

In 2002, Năstase was appointed a Grand Cross of the Order of the Star of Romania, which was revoked in December 2019 because of his double criminal indictment.

2004 presidential candidacy
The 2004 presidential election cycle marked the end of the second term of President Ion Iliescu, who, according to the constitution, could not serve another term. The PSD selected Năstase to be its presidential candidate. His running mate (selected to be prime minister in the event of a Năstase win) was then Foreign Minister Mircea Geoană.

Throughout the autumn of 2004, opinion polls predicted Năstase would win, boosted in areas and among sectors where the PSD traditionally received strong support: in rural areas, in small and medium-sized towns in the south and east of the country, and among pensioners and labor groups. The PSD, which remained by far the largest single political party in the country, was also expected to rely on its network of local party organizations to ensure voters came to the polls.

Năstase was ahead by a substantial margin during 28 November first round of the presidential elections, although he received less than 50 percent of the vote, and therefore was required to compete in a 12 December run-off election against second place center-right Justice and Truth Alliance (DA) candidate Traian Băsescu. Independent civil society organizations alleged incidents of fraud in Năstase's favor during the first round of the elections, including alleged multiple voting by PSD supporters as a result of poor controls on voter identification and flaws in the electronic vote tabulation.

At the time the polls closed on the evening of the run-off election, major media outlets released the results of exit polls showing a tie between Năstase and Băsescu. Nonetheless, Băsescu and his supporters interpreted the results as clear indication of a victory.  Tens of thousands of Băsescu's supporters converged on University Square in the center of Bucharest, and in other parts of the country, to celebrate his presumed victory. The next morning, authorities released figures confirming Băsescu's win. Năstase received only 48.77% of the total vote.

Năstase later attributed his surprise defeat to a number of factors, including what he characterized as a failure of Humanist Party (PC) politicians to campaign on his behalf (the Humanist Party had an electoral pact with the PSD at that time); and the endorsement of Băsescu by Greater Romania Party (PRM) leader Corneliu Vadim Tudor. Other likely factors include Băsescu's strong performance during the second presidential debate, as well as persistent allegations of corruption against Năstase and the PSD.

Despite Năstase's presidential defeat, the PSD still won the largest bloc of seats in the Parliament in the concurrent legislative elections. Following the elections and in the interim period before Băsescu's DA Alliance was able to form a coalition majority, the PSD succeeded in obtaining sufficient support within the parliament to elect Năstase as president of the Chamber of Deputies. Former PSD Prime Minister Nicolae Văcăroiu was elected president of the Senate in the same circumstances. Năstase resigned as Prime Minister the day after Băsescu's inauguration. Later on, at the request of Cozmin Gușă, the campaign manager of Traian Băsescu, who resigned from Băsescu's party after he got elected, requested the release of the official results regarding the alleged fraud of the 2004 elections. The investigation concluded that there were no hard evidence of this fraud and that the elected president, Traian Băsescu, had no proofs to make that statement. The accusation of stealing the elections heavily helped Băsescu win the elections, some political analysts argue.

Corruption trial, sentence and attempted suicide 

On 30 January 2012, the courts gave Năstase a two-year prison sentence for misuse of a publicly funded conference to raise cash for his unsuccessful campaign in 2004. Năstase claimed the sentence was influenced by rival politician Traian Băsescu, at the time President of Romania, and indicated that if necessary, he would take his case to the European Court of Human Rights. Responding to the allegations, Băsescu denied the charges were political in nature and claimed they stemmed from denunciations made by members of Năstase's party.

Adrian Năstase was convicted of corruption charges on 20 June 2012 and sentenced to a 2-year imprisonment term. At the time when the sentence was pronounced, he was the only head of government sentenced to prison in the 23 years following the Romanian Revolution.

When the police arrived at his home to arrest Năstase, he shot himself in the throat in an apparent suicide attempt and was taken to a hospital. Many people now believe that this apparent suicide was in fact a final botched attempt on his part to evade justice. On that night he was removed by ambulance with a Burberry scarf draped about his neck thus hiding any evidence of serious injury from gathered reporters. After receiving treatment during a six-day period, he was moved to Rahova prison and then transferred to Jilava prison on medical grounds, to be treated for his diabetes and heart condition.

In January 2014, the Romanian Supreme Court sentenced him to a four-year prison sentence for taking bribes and a three-year prison sentence for blackmail, to run concurrently. As a result, Năstase lost his status as a professor. He was eventually released later the same year, and in December 2021, 7 years later, the Romanian Supreme Court accepted Năstase's request for judicial rehabilitation with respect to the two sentences, after multiple prior attempts. If the decision remains final, Năstase will be once again able to exercise his right to vote and be elected to public office.

Publications

Năstase has published over 150 pieces on International law in Romanian and foreign journals, and has held over 140 talks at international meetings; publications include:
Human Rights: a Retrograde Concept
The Political Idea of Change
International Economic Law II
Parliamentary Humor
Romania and the New World Order
The Construction of Europe and Constitutional Supremacy
Romania's Treaties (1990–1997)
Personal Rights of the National Minorities
Regulations in International Law
The Battle for Life
Romania-NATO 2002
NATO Enlargement.

Presidential elections

See also

 List of heads of government of Romania
 List of corruption scandals in Romania

References

External links

  
  Official blog
  Adrian Năstase on Politic.ro

|-

|-

|-

|-

Eastern Orthodox Christians from Romania
Members of the Romanian Orthodox Church
Candidates for President of Romania
Prime Ministers of Romania
Romanian Ministers of Foreign Affairs
Members of the Chamber of Deputies (Romania)
Presidents of the Chamber of Deputies (Romania)
Social Democratic Party (Romania) politicians
Grand Crosses of the Order of the Star of Romania
Saint Sava National College alumni
Politicians from Bucharest
1950 births
Living people
Romanian prisoners and detainees
Prisoners and detainees of Romania
Heads of government who were later imprisoned
Romanian bloggers
Presidents of the Social Democratic Party (Romania)
Romanian politicians convicted of corruption